Håkan Lindquist (28 March 1958 – 15 December 2022) was a Swedish writer.

Biography
Lindquist made his debut in 1993 with the novel Min bror och hans bror, which was translated into several languages and received the Prix littéraire de la Bordelaise de Lunetterie. He also wrote several articles in Scandinavian cultural magazines, as well as short stories published in Sweden, Finland, Norway, Iceland, France, Germany, Hungary, and the United States. He wrote the libretto for the opera  with music by the composer B. Tommy Andersson.

Lindquist died in Stockholm on 15 December 2022, at the age of 64.

Novels
My Brother and his Brother (original: Min bror och hans bror, 1993)
Dröm att leva (1996)
On collecting stamps (original: Om att samla frimärken, 2003)
I ett annat land (2006)
Nära vatten (2010)
Regn och åska (2011)
Requiem (2013)
Tre dagar och två nätter (2013)
Ariel tjugofyra/sju (2020)

References

Further reading
  Håkan Lindquist (a portrait with subtitles in French; Youtube, 1film1auteur, 2015)

1958 births
2022 deaths
20th-century Swedish writers
21st-century Swedish writers
People from Kalmar Municipality
Swedish novelists